Amt Oder-Welse is a former Amt ("collective municipality") in the district of Uckermark, in Brandenburg, Germany. Its seat was in Pinnow. It was disbanded in April 2022.

The Amt Oder-Welse consisted of the following municipalities:
Berkholz-Meyenburg
Mark Landin
Passow
Pinnow

Demography

References 

Oder-Welse
Uckermark (district)